Solène Jambaqué (born 14 April 1988 in Toulouse) is a French alpine skier and two time Paralympic Champion.

She competed in the 2006 Winter Paralympics in Turin, Italy.
She won a gold medal in the Super-G and Downhill, a silver medal in Slalom, and a bronze medal in the Giant Slalom, standing.

She competed in the 2010 Winter Paralympics in Vancouver, Canada, where she won a silver medal in the Downhill and the Super combined, standing. She became 6th in the Giant Slalom, 4th at the Super-G and 8th at the Slalom, standing.

References

External links
 
 
 

1988 births
Living people
French female alpine skiers
Paralympic alpine skiers of France
Paralympic gold medalists for France
Paralympic silver medalists for France
Paralympic bronze medalists for France
Alpine skiers at the 2006 Winter Paralympics
Alpine skiers at the 2010 Winter Paralympics
Alpine skiers at the 2014 Winter Paralympics
Medalists at the 2006 Winter Paralympics
Medalists at the 2010 Winter Paralympics
Medalists at the 2014 Winter Paralympics
Sportspeople from Toulouse
Paralympic medalists in alpine skiing
21st-century French women